Plummer Additional is a township and single tier municipality located in Algoma District in Northeastern Ontario, Canada. The township had a population of 660 in the Canada 2016 Census.

Communities 
The township includes the communities of Bruce Station, Cloudslee, Plummer, Rock Lake and Rydal Bank.

The town of Bruce Mines is wholly surrounded by, but politically independent of, the township; it was separated in 1903. However, the 2010 mayoral election in Bruce Mines was won by Gordon Post, a candidate who pledged to investigate the feasibility of reamalgamating the two municipalities.

History
Rydal Bank Church located at Rydal Bank within the township is a municipally designated heritage site.

Demographics 

Population trend: 
 Population in 2016: 660
 Population in 2011: 650
 Population in 2006: 625
 Population in 2001: 671
 Population in 1996: 693
 Population in 1991: 596

Transportation
The township is served by Ontario Highway 17 which traverses the south in an east–west orientation, and Ontario Highway 638, which travels the middle of the township in a north–south orientation.

See also
List of townships in Ontario

References

External links

Municipalities in Algoma District
Single-tier municipalities in Ontario
Township municipalities in Ontario